Car Fulla White Boys is the second solo studio album by American rapper Haystak. It was released on July 20, 2000 via Street Flava Records and Koch Records. Recording sessions took place at Street Flavor Recording Studios in Nashville, Tennessee. Production was handled by Kevin "DJ Dev" Grisham, Sonny Paradise and Shannon Sanders.

Track listing

Personnel 
Jason Winfree – main artist
Ayesha Porter – background vocals
Ivy Brown – background vocals
Jeff Priebe – background vocals
Shannon Sanders – background vocals, horns, producer
Terry Hudson – background vocals
Andrew Ramsey – guitar & bass
Charlie Barrett – guitar (track 10)
Kevin "DJ Dev" Grisham – scratches, producer
David Davidson – strings
Sonny Paradise – producer, executive producer
Brian Hardin – mixing
Bernard Grundman – mastering
Larry Paradise – executive producer
Manor Graphix – graphics, layout, design

References

External links

2000 albums
Haystak albums